William Watson Springsteen (October 27, 1899 – October 1, 1985) was a professional football player for the National Football League's Frankford Yellow Jackets from 1925 until 1926. He won the 1926 NFL championship with the Yellow Jackets. He then played for the Chicago Cardinals during the 1927 and 1928 seasons. He attended Northwestern High School, located in Detroit, Michigan.

On December 8, 1923, during his junior year of college, Springsteen was elected captain of the Lehigh University football team.

Notes

External links

1899 births
American football centers
Frankford Yellow Jackets players
Chicago Cardinals players
Lehigh Mountain Hawks football players
1985 deaths
Players of American football from New York (state)